Taran Noah Smith (born April 8, 1984) is an American former actor widely known for his role as Mark Taylor on the sitcom  Home Improvement.

Personal life
At 18, he gained control of his $1.5 million trust fund, which he accused his parents of squandering by purchasing themselves a mansion. His mother, Candy Bennici, stated in 2015, "Of course we didn't touch his money... It was in a trust fund. We couldn't have touched it if we wanted to. They were trying to get it when he was 17, and we were trying to protect it. Luckily the Marin courts were very good about it and didn't give it to them". He later said, "I'd gotten out of the teenage phase and realized my parents weren't doing anything wrong but were trying to protect me."

In 2001, Smith was quoted as saying, "I started Home Improvement when I was seven, and the show ended when I was 16. I never had the chance to decide what I wanted to do with my life. When I was 16, I knew that I didn't want to act anymore." At the age of 17, Smith married Heidi van Pelt on April 27, 2001. The marriage sparked much controversy due to the couple's age difference, as van Pelt was 16 years older. The couple filed for divorce on February 2, 2007.

In 2005, Smith and his then-wife formed a California-based non-dairy cheese manufacturer and restaurant, Playfood, specializing in vegan and organic foods. In 2014, he volunteered doing disaster relief with Communitere in the Philippines.

Smith is also the Technical Manager for the Community Submersibles Project, where he teaches people how to pilot submarines.

Starting July 2022, Smith joined SpaceX as an integration technician.

Smith is a vegan.

Filmography

Awards

Nominations
 1993, Young Artist Award, Home Improvement, Outstanding Actor Under Ten in a Television Series
 1999, Young Artist Award, Home Improvement, Best Performance in a TV Drama or Comedy Series – Leading Young Actor

Won
 1992, Young Artist Award, Home Improvement, Exceptional Performance by a Young Actor Under Ten
 1994, Young Artist Award, Home Improvement, Outstanding Youth Ensemble in a Television Series (shared with Zachery Ty Bryan and Jonathan Taylor Thomas)

References

External links
 

1984 births
Living people
American male child actors
American male film actors
American male television actors
Male actors from San Francisco
20th-century American male actors
Child marriage in the United States